The Lawless State was written in 1976 jointly by Morton H. Halperin, Jerry J. Berman, Robert L. Borosage, and Christine M. Marwick.  It recounts abuses of power by the U.S. Government throughout the Cold War, and is concerned mostly with surveillance methods and overstepped boundaries.

Topics mentioned include:

The CIA and FBI using illegal intelligence and intimidation methods through wiretaps and COINTELPRO.
The use of dissent-limiting programs such as Operation Chaos to link dissenting anti-war organizations to the USSR, and extensive FBI investigation and sabotage of Martin Luther King Jr.
U.S. Government activity in South America, and its part in the Chilean coup that put dictator Augusto Pinochet in power.

1976 non-fiction books
 Works about the Cold War
 History of law enforcement in the United States